Thales Bento Oleques (born 28 April 1994), simply known as Thales is a Brazilian professional footballer playing for Brazilian Campeonato Brasileiro Série B side Avaí as a defender.

Club career
Born in Pelotas, Thales spend his youth years at Paulista from 2009 to 2013. After he was promoted to the first team in 2013, he made 19 appearances, before joining Segunda Liga club Braga B on loan in search of more opportunities.

References

External links
 
 
 Braga profile

1994 births
People from Pelotas
Living people
Association football defenders
Brazilian footballers
Paulista Futebol Clube players
S.C. Braga B players
Esporte Clube Juventude players
F.C. Arouca players
Avaí FC players
Campeonato Brasileiro Série A players
Campeonato Brasileiro Série C players
Primeira Liga players
Liga Portugal 2 players
Campeonato de Portugal (league) players
Brazilian expatriate footballers
Expatriate footballers in Portugal
Brazilian expatriate sportspeople in Portugal
Sportspeople from Rio Grande do Sul